In music, a hexachord (also hexachordon) is a six-note series, as exhibited in a scale (hexatonic or hexad) or tone row. The term was adopted in this sense during the Middle Ages and adapted in the 20th century in Milton Babbitt's serial theory.

Middle Ages

The hexachord as a mnemonic device was first described by Guido of Arezzo, in his Epistola de ignoto cantu. In each hexachord, all adjacent pitches are a whole tone apart, except for the middle two, which are separated by a semitone. These six pitches are named ut, re, mi, fa, sol, and la, with the semitone between mi and fa. These six names are derived from the first syllable of each half-verse of the first stanza of the 8th-century Vesper hymn Ut queant laxis resonare fibris / Mira gestorum famuli tuorum, etc. Melodies with a range wider than a major sixth required the device of mutation to a new hexachord. For example, the hexachord beginning on C and rising to A, named hexachordum naturale, has its only semitone between the notes E and F, and stops short of the note B or B. A melody moving a semitone higher than la (namely, from A to the B above) required changing the la to mi, so that the required B becomes fa. Because B was named by the "soft" or rounded letter B, the hexachord with this note in it was called the hexachordum molle (soft hexachord). Similarly, the hexachord with mi and fa expressed by the notes B and C was called the hexachordum durum (hard hexachord), because the B was represented by a squared-off, or "hard" B. Starting in the 14th century, these three hexachords were extended in order to accommodate the increasing use of signed accidentals on other notes.

The introduction of these new notes was principally a product of polyphony, which required the placing of a perfect fifth not only above the old note B, but also below its newly created variant, this entailing, as a result of the "original sin" committed by the well-meant innovation B, the introduction of the still newer respective notes F and E, with as consequences of these last C and A, and so on. The new notes, being outside the gamut of those ordinarily available, had to be "imagined", or "feigned" (it was long forbidden to write them), and for this reason music containing them was called musica ficta or musica falsa.

20th century

Allen Forte in The Structure of Atonal Music redefines the term hexachord to mean what other theorists (notably Howard Hanson in his Harmonic Materials of Modern Music: Resources of the Tempered Scale) mean by the term hexad, a six-note pitch collection which is not necessarily a contiguous segment of a scale or a tone row. David Lewin used the term in this sense as early as 1959. Carlton Gamer uses both terms interchangeably.

See also
Hexatonic scale
Musica ficta
Guidonian hand
Combinatoriality
Hexachordal complementation
6-20, 6-34, 6-Z43, and 6-Z44

Sources

Further reading
 Rahn, John. 1980. Basic Atonal Theory. Longman Music Series. New York and London: Longman Inc. .
 Roeder, John. "Set (ii)". The New Grove Dictionary of Music and Musicians, second edition, edited by Stanley Sadie and John Tyrrell. London: Macmillan Publishers, 2001.

External links
 Hexachords, solmization, and musica ficta